John Chamberlain (died 1617) of Prestbury, Gloucestershire was an English politician.

Family
He was the son of the diplomat Sir Thomas Chamberlain of Prestbury, Gloucestershire. He married Elizabeth, daughter of Sir John Thynne, but had no children.

Career
He matriculated at Trinity College, Oxford in 1579. He served as sheriff of Gloucestershire in 1596-7. He has been identified as the man who sat for Clitheroe in 1593 and St Germans in 1597.

References

1610s deaths
English MPs 1597–1598
English MPs 1593